Alexander King may refer to:

Alexander Campbell King (1856–1926), U.S. Solicitor General and federal judge
Alexander King (footballer) (1871–1957), Scottish footballer
Alexander King (author) (1899–1965), U.S. humorist, memoirist, and TV personality
Alexander King (scientist) (1909–2007), British sustainable development pioneer
Alexander King (MP) (fl. 1588–1601), British MP for Bishop's Castle
Alex King (rugby union) (born 1975), English footballer
Alex King (basketball) (born 1985), German basketball player
Alex King (referee), Australian soccer referee

See also
King Alexander (disambiguation)